Seyqalan (also Romanized as Şeyqalān; also known as Segelyan) is a village in Tulem Rural District, Tulem District, Sowme'eh Sara County, Gilan Province, Iran. At the 2006 census, its population was 322, in 105 families.

References 

Populated places in Sowme'eh Sara County